Gennady Yagubov (Russian: Геннадий Владимирович  Ягубов; born 17 April 1968) is a Russian politician serving as a senator from the Duma of Stavropol Krai since 8 October 2021.

Gennady Yagubov is under personal sanctions introduced by the European Union, the United Kingdom, the USA, Canada, Switzerland, Australia, Ukraine, New Zealand, for ratifying the decisions of the "Treaty of Friendship, Cooperation and Mutual Assistance between the Russian Federation and the Donetsk People's Republic and between the Russian Federation and the Luhansk People's Republic" and providing political and economic support for Russia's annexation of Ukrainian territories.

Biography

Gennady Yagubov was born on 6 June 1957 in Budyonnovsk, Stavropol Krai. In 1992, he graduated from the Stavropol State Agrarian University. From 1968 to 1988, he served in the Soviet Army. Afterwards, he worked as an engineer and later as a director of the municipal enterprise of Budennovsk "Combine improvement". From 2010 to 2021, he was the deputy of Duma of Stavropol Krai. In 2021, he became the senator from the Duma of Stavropol Krai.

References

Living people
1968 births
United Russia politicians
21st-century Russian politicians
People from Budyonnovsk
Members of the Federation Council of Russia (after 2000)